José Luiz de França Penna (born 27 December 1945) is a Brazilian businessman, musician and politician. He is a former member of the Chamber of Deputies and is leader of the Green Party.

References 

Living people
1945 births
Green Party (Brazil) politicians
Members of the Chamber of Deputies (Brazil) from São Paulo
21st-century Brazilian politicians
Brazilian musicians
Brazilian businesspeople
Leaders of political parties in Brazil
20th-century Brazilian actors